The 2020 International Darts Open was the fourth and final PDC European Tour event on the 2020 PDC Pro Tour. The tournament took place at the SACHSENarena, Riesa, Germany from 23–25 October 2020. It featured a field of 48 players and £140,000 in prize money, with £25,000 going to the winner.

Gerwyn Price was the defending champion after defeating Rob Cross 8–6 in the final of the 2019 tournament. However, he was beaten 6–5 by Ross Smith in the second round.

Joe Cullen won his second European Tour title and fourth PDC title in all by defeating Michael van Gerwen 8–5 in the final, which also secured his place as the number 1 seed for the European Championship. It was the same scoreline against the same player as at his first ET title in Mannheim.

The tournament was postponed from its original date in early 2020 due to the COVID-19 pandemic in Germany.

Prize money
This is how the prize money is divided, with the prize money being unchanged from the 2019 European Tour:

 Seeded players who lose in the second round and Host Nation invitees who lose in the first round do not receive this prize money on any Orders of Merit.

Qualification and format
The top 16 entrants from the PDC ProTour Order of Merit on 4 February automatically qualified for the event and were seeded in the second round.

The remaining 32 places went to players from four qualifying events and to two invitees – 23 from the Tour Card Holder Qualifier (held on 14 February), two from the Associate Member Qualifier (held on 15 October), three from the Host Nation Qualifier (held on 22 October), one from the Nordic & Baltic Associate Member Qualifier (held on 12 October 2019), and one from the East European Associate Member Qualifier (held on 8 February).

The two highest ranked German players on the ProTour Order of Merit as of the 14 February cut-off date also qualified.

Kyle Anderson, Peter Wright, Dirk van Duijvenbode and Ryan Murray withdrew, while Niels Zonneveld and Glen Durrant pulled out because of contracting COVID-19. All six players were replaced by Host Nation Qualifiers, while José de Sousa and Stephen Bunting were promoted to seeds.

The following players took part in the tournament:

Top 16
  Michael van Gerwen (runner-up)
  Gerwyn Price (second round)
  Ian White (second round)
  Krzysztof Ratajski (quarter-finals)
  Mensur Suljović (semi-finals)
  Daryl Gurney (second round)
  Dave Chisnall (third round)
  James Wade (quarter-finals)
  Nathan Aspinall (third round)
  Joe Cullen (champion)
  Adrian Lewis (second round)
  Jamie Hughes (third round)
  Rob Cross (second round)
  Michael Smith (semi-finals)
  José de Sousa (second round)
  Stephen Bunting (second round)

Tour Card Qualifier
  Kai Fan Leung (first round)
  Jamie Lewis (first round)
  Andy Hamilton (third round)
  Jason Lowe (second round)
  Jesús Noguera (third round)
  Madars Razma (second round)
  Jelle Klaasen (first round)
  Martin Schindler (second round)
  Maik Kuivenhoven (first round)
  Ron Meulenkamp (second round)
  Danny Noppert (quarter-finals)
  Ross Smith (quarter-finals)
  Brendan Dolan (first round)
  Benito van de Pas (first round)
  Martijn Kleermaker (second round)
  Steve West (second round)
  Toni Alcinas (first round)
  Scott Baker (third round)

Associate Member Qualifier
  Scott Marsh (first round)
  Mario Vandenbogaerde (first round)

Highest Ranked Germans
  Gabriel Clemens (second round)
  Max Hopp (third round)

Host Nation Qualifier
  Robert Marijanović (second round)
  Simeon Heinz (first round)
  Michael Unterbuchner (first round)
  Philipp Hagemann (first round)
  Franz Rötzsch (third round)
  Sebastian Pohl (first round)
  Michael Rosenauer (first round)
  Arsen Ballaj (first round)

Nordic & Baltic Qualifier
  Andreas Harrysson (second round)

East European Qualifier
  Tytus Kanik (first round)

Draw

References 

2020 PDC Pro Tour
2020 PDC European Tour
2020 in German sport
October 2020 sports events in Germany
International Darts Open